Sweet Freedom (also known as Sweet Freedom – The Best of Michael McDonald in some countries) is a compilation album by American singer and songwriter Michael McDonald, released in 1986 on the Warner Bros. label.

Content
The album includes singles and album tracks from McDonald's first two solo albums, If That's What It Takes (1982) and No Lookin' Back (1985), along with duets with James Ingram ("Yah Mo B There"), Patti LaBelle ("On My Own") and one song from when McDonald was lead singer of the rock band The Doobie Brothers ("What a Fool Believes"). The album's title track, "Sweet Freedom", was a newly recorded song and featured on the soundtrack to the 1986 film Running Scared.

Commercial performance
The album reached No. 6 in the UK Albums Chart and is McDonald's most successful album in that country.

Track listing
"Sweet Freedom" (Rod Temperton) – 4:04
"(I’ll Be Your) Angel" (Michael McDonald, Chuck Sabatino) – 3:48
"Yah Mo B There" – with James Ingram (James Ingram, Michael McDonald, Rod Temperton, Quincy Jones) – 4:29
"I Gotta Try" (Michael McDonald, Kenny Loggins) – 3:49
"I Keep Forgettin’" (Jerry Leiber and Mike Stoller, Adpt. Michael McDonald and Ed Sanford) – 3:39
"Our Love (Remix)" (Michael McDonald, David Pack) – 4:18
"On My Own" – with Patti LaBelle (Burt Bacharach, Carole Bayer Sager) - 4:39
"No Looking Back" (Michael McDonald, Kenny Loggins, Ed Sanford) – 3:54
"Any Foolish Thing" (Michael McDonald, Chuck Sabatino) – 4:22
"That’s Why" (Michael McDonald, Randy Goodrum) – 4:22
"What a Fool Believes" – with The Doobie Brothers (Michael McDonald, Kenny Loggins) – 3:40
"I Can Let Go Now" (Michael McDonald) – 2:53

Production
 Track 1 produced by Rod Temperton, Dick Rudolph and Bruce Swedien
 Tracks 2, 6, 8 & 9 produced by Michael McDonald and Ted Templeman; engineered and mixed by Ross Pallone
 Track 3 produced by Quincy Jones for Quincy Jones Productions
 Tracks 4, 5, 10 & 12 produced by Ted Templeman and Lenny Waronker
 Track 6 remixed by Humberto Gatica
 Track 7 produced and arranged by Burt Bacharach and Carole Bayer Sager; executive producer – Patti LaBelle
 Track 11 produced by Ted Templeman; engineered by Donn Landee
 Album remastered by Lee Herschberg
 This compilation produced 1986 by WEA International Inc.

Charts and certifications

Weekly charts

Certifications

References

1986 compilation albums
Michael McDonald (musician) albums
Warner Records compilation albums